Digrammia atrofasciata is a species of geometrid moth in the family Geometridae. It was described by Alpheus Spring Packard in 1876 and is found in North America.

The MONA or Hodges number for Digrammia atrofasciata is 6368.

References

 Ferguson, Douglas C. & Hodges, R. W., et al., eds. (2008). "Geometroidea: Geometridae (part), Ennominae (Part - Abraxini, Cassymini, Macariini)". The Moths of North America North of Mexico, fasc. 17.2, 430.
 Ferris C. (2010). "A revision of the genus Antepione Packard with description of the new genus Pionenta Ferris (Lepidoptera, Geometridae, Ennominae)". ZooKeys 71: 49-70.
 Scoble, Malcolm J., ed. (1999). Geometrid Moths of the World: A Catalogue (Lepidoptera, Geometridae), 1016.

Further reading

 

Macariini